Julie Matthews (born 1963) is an English singer-songwriter, multi-instrumentalist, and record producer. She has been a member of some of the most influential British folk duos and groups and is acknowledged internationally as a major songwriter, with her work being covered by a wide range of artists and groups. Her music is often classified as English folk, but contains strong American influences.

Early career
Julie Matthews was born in Sheffield, Yorkshire, England. The daughter of a steel worker, she began playing guitar at the age of nine before teaching herself piano. While still at school she began songwriting and recording and was soon exploring what she would identify as the three primary jobs of her songwriting: ‘confession, observation and social comment’. She left school at 18 and began writing songs for a small London publishing company. After only a few months the company went bankrupt, forcing her to work for several years as a nightclub and hotel pianist throughout Europe, while still playing her own music at festivals.

With Pat Shaw
Julie met Pat Shaw at a session at a local radio station and they formed a musical partnership, singing and playing together. However, while singing at the Feet First Festival in Derbyshire in 1990 Julie was seen by Ashley Hutchings, who invited her to join the Albion Band. With a lack of progress of their own projects Pat began a career in teaching and Julie joined the Albion Band and toured with them for three years. No studio album was created with this line-up, but recordings from this period surfaced as Captured (1995).

Julie and Pat Shaw released their first album, As Long As I Am Able, in 1992. As things began to move forward as part of a duo again Julie left the Albion Band in 1993 and was replaced by songwriter, guitarist and singer Chris While. Julie and Pat joined fellow south Yorkshire musicians Kathleen and Rosalie Deighton, Kate Rusby, and Kathryn Roberts for the highly regarded album Intuition (1993). The same year they released their debut album Lies and Alibi's. All the compositions were by Julie including 'Thorn Upon a Rose', which was subsequently covered as a single by Mary Black and which charted in Ireland and Japan, helping to establish Julie's growing reputation as a songwriter of note. The album received critical acclaim being nominated in the 'rising star' category of the Great British Country Music Awards; this led to the duo opening for Mary Chapin Carpenter at Her Majesty's Theatre in London in 1994.  However, soon after Pat returned to her career in teaching and Julie rejoined the Albion Band.

The Albion Band 
Julie and Chris While now became the mainstay of writing within the band. The 1995 release Albion Heart included the While/Matthews collaborations of 'Man in the Bottle' (with Ashley Hutchings) and the title track, which became something of a group anthem and provided the first evidence of a fruitful musical collaboration. In addition Julie contributed three tracks, including the memorable up tempo 'Devil in Me' and the ballad 'Love is an Abandoned Car'. In 1995 Chris and Julie toured Canada as 'The Women of Albion'. The intention was a one-off project, however, positive audience reception and their growing musical partnership led them towards pursuing joint projects. They released an EP Blue Moon on the Rise (1995) with five jointly penned tracks, including the since much recorded reworking of a traditional theme as ‘Young Man Cut Down in His Prime’.

Matthews' solo debut, Such Is Life (1996), was notable for the fact that six of the fourteen tracks that had already been recorded. One had been taken by Fairport Convention to be used as the title track of their 1995 album Jewel in the Crown, (the anti-imperial message of which led to accusations of being unpatriotic) and 'Love me or Not' was covered by Frances Black.  In 1996 Julie and Chris joined with Christine Collister, Melanie Harrold and Helen Watson to form Daphne's Flight. They produced an eponymous record that showcased the formidable vocal talent in the group. The last Albion album with Chris and Julie, Demi Paradise, was released in 1996. Julie contributed to five of the twelve tracks, but by this point Julie and Chris had decided to focus on their solo and joint work and left the band after the 1997 Cropredy Festival in August.

While and Matthews

In the Big Room to Stages 
Julie co-produced Chris's solo album, In the Big Room, with writing credits for on two songs and instrumental contributions on every track.  This was followed by their first album as a duo, Piecework, in 1998. This included what are often considered some of Chris and Julie's most powerful songs and marked the emergence of their distinctive and highly polished sound. It included the Matthews penned 'Class Reunion' which soon became a concert favourite; the moving collaboration 'Even the Desert' and 'Seven Years of Rust' which was based on her father's experiences: memorably expressing triumph over adversity. A busy recording schedule resulted in their second album Higher Potential in October 1999, which showcased their diverse influences. Tracks penned by Julie included the wistful ‘Angels Walk Among Us’ and the up tempo ‘Digging Holes’. The following year there was the much anticipated double live album, Stages, which managed to capture some of the duo’s outstanding live sound and stagecraft, as well as many of their best songs to date.

Quest to Perfect Mistake 
Their third joint studio album, Quest (2001), was produced by acclaimed Ghanaian musician Kwame Yeboah of e2K and featured his multi-instrumental skills. It was hailed as their best album to date, and as cementing their position 'as two of Britain's most important singer/songwriters'. In this period Chris and Julie began to tour frequently in the UK, Europe, Africa, North America and Australia. They are particularly well regarded in the last of these, where they fill large concert halls and attend the major festivals. For the 2004 release Perfect Mistake Julie took the major share of the songwriting duties, contributing nine of the twelve tracks and sharing another two with Chris, with her creations much enhanced by Chris’ outstanding performances, harmonies and instrumental skills.

Here and Now to Shoulder To Shoulder
In 2005, they released Here and Now, recorded at the Worden Arts Centre in Leyland Lancashire, with a more acoustic and stripped down sound. The live vibe may explain its very positive reception in the music press, especially among more traditional folk commentators. In the same year Julie released her second solo album Slow, which showcased some of her down tempo songwriting and which received positive, if not effusive, reviews. Stage 2: Live at the Firehouse (2007) was a second live album from the duo containing some fan favourites and songs written since 2000. In 2008 Chris and Julie released their sixth studio album Together Alone to further critical acclaim, with Propaganda magazine describing the duo as ‘dealing so very tenderly with simple universal truths, they achieve their impact by an astute economy of expression allied to warmly accessible melodies and arrangements’.
 
In 2006, they released their first 'Best Of' album which covered their duo career up to Here & Now. 2010 saw the release of Hitting The Ground Running then in 2012 came Infinite Sky. Who We Are was released in 2014 and the single "If This Were Your Last Day" from that album was on the BBC Radio 2 playlist for three weeks. They appeared on Weekend Wogan live and were played on daytime radio. Their 10th album in 22 years Shoulder to Shoulder was released in September 2016.

Diverse projects 
While pursuing a career based around her work with Chris While and her solo endeavours, Julie has fitted a number of diverse projects into a busy schedule of touring and recording.

St Agnes Fountain 
In December 2001, Chris and Julie joined forces with Chris Leslie and David Hughes to form the Christmas project St Agnes Fountain, which combined original music, unique arrangements of classic seasonal songs, with a good deal of humour. They have toured in the pre-Christmas season every year since and released 'Acoustic Carols for Christmas' in 2001 to critical acclaim and have produced five subsequent albums: Comfort and Joy (2002), The Show (2003), Three Ships (2003) The White Xmas Album (2006) and Soul Cake (2008).

Blue Tapestry 
In 2002 the duo collaborated with outstanding instrumentalists Maartin Allcock, Pete Zorn and Neil Marshall for a series of live performances under the title 'Blue Tapestry', which cumulated in a rapturous reception by 20,000 fans at the 2003 Cropredy Festival. This was a show featuring the music of Carole King and Joni Mitchell, which resulted in a subsequent release of Blue Tapestry Live (2003).

Radio work 
As a duo While and Matthews have worked on several musical projects for the BBC including Tales of the Towpath (2005), a radio documentary about the building of the Manchester Ship Canal and the 2006 Radio Ballads. Julie wrote 11 of the songs, covering four of the programmes for the critically acclaimed shows. In 2007, Julie embarked on a solo tour that featured these songs, interspersing the live performances with recordings of the original testimonies the songs were written around.

Party on the Lawn 
While and Matthews have an annual festival 'Party on the Lawn' which takes place at Prebendal Farm, Bishopstone, Wiltshire in June.

Rejoice the Voice 
Chris and Julie, along with fellow Daphne's Flight member Helen Watson, also tour with their woman’s vocal workshop 'Rejoice the Voice', providing women with an opportunity to sing collectively and improve their vocal technique. In 2009 Julie, Chris and Helen released Bare Bones, featuring some of the songs they worked on at the 'Rejoice the Voice' workshops.

Record production
As well as producing her own, Chris’s and some of their joint albums, Julie has also produced albums for other artists, including Helen Watson's Somersault (1998) and Lifesize (2002) and Kellie While's Tenacious (2001).

Awards 
While and Matthews have been nominated as best duo in the BBC Radio 2 Folk awards seven times and as best live act twice and won the 'Best Duo' award in 2009.

Discography

Solo albums  
Such is Life (1996)
Slow (2006)

With Chris While and Helen Watson 
Bare Bones (2009)

With Pat Shaw 
As Long as I am Able (1992)
Lies and Alibis (1993)

With Kathleen Deighton, Rosalie Deighton, Kathryn Roberts, Kate Rusby, and Pat Shaw
Intuition (1993)

With the Albion Band  
Captured (1995)
Albion Heart (1995)
Demi Paradise (1996)
The Acoustic Years 1993–97 (1997)
Albion Heart on Tour (2004)

With Chris While 
Blue Moon on the Rise EP (1995)
Piecework (1998)
Higher Potential (1999)
Stages (2000)
Quest (2001)
Perfect Mistake (2004)
Here and Now (2005)
The Best of While and Matthews (2006)
Stage 2: Live at the Firehouse (2007)
Together Alone (2008)
Hitting The Ground Running
Infinite Sky (2012)
Who We Are (2014
Shoulder To Shoulder (September 2016)
The Duo's Website

With Daphne's Flight 
Daphne's Flight (1996)
New album due for release in 2017

With St Agnes Fountain 
Acoustic Carols for Christmas (2001)
Comfort and Joy (2002)
The Show (2003)
Three Ships (2003)
The White Xmas Album (2006)
Soul Cake (2008)
Spirit of Christmas (2010)
Best of St Agnes Fountain (Double CD) (2011)
Twelve Years of Christmas (2012)
Christmas is not Far Away (2014)
The Best of St Agnes Fountain Vol.2 (2015)

With Blue Tapestry 
Blue Tapestry Live (2003)

References

1963 births
Living people
English folk musicians
English folk singers
English women singer-songwriters
Musicians from Sheffield
The Albion Band members
Daphne's Flight members